Bardonecchia (or  ;) is an Italian town and comune located in the Metropolitan City of Turin, in the Piedmont region, in the western part of Susa Valley. It grew out of a small village with the works for the Frejus Rail Tunnel, the first crossing the Alps.

The town hosted the snowboarding events of the 2006 Winter Olympics.

Geography

The historic center is set back and elevated (Borgo Vecchio), while the new part of town was built around the train station (Borgo Nuovo). The town has grown thanks to activities related to customs, logistics, and tourism; as a result, it has incorporated some neighboring villages and thus is one of the largest towns in the Susa Valley.

Bardonecchia is at one end of both the Fréjus Road Tunnel and the Fréjus Rail Tunnel, part of a TGV Paris to Milan connection.

The municipality of Bardonecchia contains the frazioni (subdivisions, mainly villages and hamlets) Les Arnauds, Melezet, Millaures, Le Gleise, Beaulard, Grange Horres, La Rho and Rochemolles.

Bardonecchia borders the following municipalities: Avrieux (France), Bramans (France), Exilles, Modane (France), Névache (France), Oulx.

Bardonecchia is the westernmost comune in Italy.

Sport
 Sportroccia—first international rock climbing competition (1985–1989).

References
This article contains information from the French, Italian, and German Wikipedias.

 2006 Winter Olympics official report. Volume 3. pp. 59–60.

External links
 Official site of the town 
 Unofficial site 
 Photos
 Weather Bardonecchia

Olympic snowboarding venues
Venues of the 2006 Winter Olympics